Apan Por is a 1992 Bengali Drama Film directed by Tapan Saha and produced by Joytara Pictures under the banner of Joytara Pictures. The film features actors Prosenjit Chatterjee and Juhi Chawla in the lead roles. Music of the film has been composed by Bappi Lahiri. The film soundtrack has a superhit song Aamar Garbo Shudhu Ei, sung by Asha Bhosle.

Cast 
 Prosenjit Chatterjee as Gora
 Juhi Chawla as Swapna
 Shubhendu Chatterjee as Doctor
 Sumitra Mukherjee as Swapna's Aunty
 Anuradha Ray as Buli
 Uttam Mohanty as Alok Mukherjee
 Kaushik Banerjee as Amiyo
 Dolon Roy
 Pallavi Chatterjee
 Mrinal Mukherjee as Doctor
 Tito Bandyopadhyay
 Basanta Chowdhury as Pratap Chandra

References

External links
 

Bengali-language Indian films
1992 films
1990s Bengali-language films
Indian romantic drama films